The Woman with the Whip is a 1952 biography of political leader and cultural icon Eva Perón. Published in England and the United States shortly after Eva Perón's death, it portrays Eva Perón in a highly critical light and is often dismissed by Perón supporters as lacking in historical value. The book, however was wildly popular and is still highly regarded by academics and considered a valuable work of journalism. The book is thought to be the basis for the Andrew Lloyd Webber and Tim Rice musical Evita. However, the book was never officially credited as such, and Rice incorporated many other historical materials as background.

This book was not initially published in Argentina, because Juan Perón, Eva Perón's husband, was head of state at the time. During his regime freedom of speech was suppress and critics were detained. The author, Mary Main, used the pseudonym "María Flores" in the initial publication. Only after Perón death in the 1970's, was the book published with Mary Main's real name.

Mary Main was born in Argentina and later moved to the United States in 1941. She returned to Buenos Aires to write The Woman with the Whip where she conducted her researched and interviews covertly citing the strong government repression and fear for her life.

Marysa Navarro, another of Eva biographer and author of Evita, is critical of Mary Main's book. Navarro argues that Main ignored the political, social and economical background of the period.

References 

Anti-Peronism
Cultural depictions of Eva Perón